Sueño Stereo (Spanish for Stereo Dream) is the seventh and final studio album recorded by Argentine rock band Soda Stereo. It was released by BMG Argentina in 1995. It is considered one of the most important alternative rock records in Spanish and one of the most successful and most important by the band and in all of Latin rock. Rolling Stone considered it the fourth-best in Latin rock history.

In just fifteen days of sales in Latin America, the album went platinum. The album was the centerpiece of the extensive Sueño Stereo tour that the band undertook in Venezuela, Colombia, Perú, Chile, Honduras, Panamá, Costa Rica, México and the United States, which began on September 8, 1995, in Buenos Aires, and ended on 24 April 1996 in Santiago de Chile.

The music video for "Ella usó mi cabeza como un revólver", directed by Stanley Gonczanski, was winner of the People's MTV 1996, the only MTV award to Latin music that existed at that time.

Background
Although Soda Stereo were known by mixing many styles and genres inside a same album, this record goes beyond and it has many more different sounds and influences, like pop, pop rock, alternative rock, dream pop, Britpop, electronic, shoegaze, progressive rock, psychedelic pop or ambient pop. One of curiosities about Sueño Stereo it's the band seemed 
obsessed with  The Beatles's Revolver (1966) and the album has many references to it, since album cover's choice of colors; a song with the word "Revolver" in it (Ella usó mi cabeza como un revólver); and musical in songs like "Paseando por Roma", having a bass line based on "Taxman" and strings in chorus based on "Got to Get You into My Life". Also B-side "Superstar" is based on "She Said She Said". In 1995 they traveled to London, UK, to make the final mixing of the álbum, and in an interview they spoke about the Beatles influence during all of their career.

Tracks 9 through 12 in the second half of the album – "Crema de Estrellas", "Planta", "X-Playo", and "Moirè" – are musically strung together, forming a medley likened by Cerati to a "little concept album". The songs refer lyrically to a drugged trip, inspired by Cerati's experiences with ayahuasca, and follow each other chronologically.

Track listing

Personnel
Soda Stereo:
 Gustavo Cerati – lead vocals, guitar, fretless bass guitar, Rhodes piano, synthesizers, producer
 Zeta Bosio – bass guitar, backing vocals, synthesizers, harmonica, producer
 Charly Alberti – drums, percussion

Additional personnel:
 Alejandro Terán – viola
 Janos Morel – first violin
 Mauricio Alves – second violin
 Pablo Flumetti – cello
 Roy Málaga – piano
 Flavio Etcheto – trumpet

Certifications

References

External links
 Lyrics

1995 albums
Soda Stereo albums
Experimental rock albums by Argentine artists
Sony Music Argentina albums